The Edmonton Metropolitan Region (EMR), also commonly referred to as Greater Edmonton or Metro Edmonton, is a conglomeration of municipalities centred on Alberta's provincial capital of Edmonton.

The EMR's commonly known boundaries are coincident with those of the Edmonton census metropolitan area (CMA) as delineated by Statistics Canada. However, its boundaries are defined differently for Edmonton Metropolitan Region Board administrative purposes.

The EMR is considered a major gateway to northern Alberta and the Canadian North, particularly for many companies, including airlines and oil/natural gas exploration. Located within central Alberta and at the northern end of the Calgary–Edmonton Corridor, the EMR is the northernmost metropolitan area in Canada.

Edmonton CMA 
The Edmonton CMA includes the following 35 census subdivisions (municipalities or municipality equivalents):
six cities (Beaumont, Edmonton, Fort Saskatchewan, Leduc, St. Albert, and Spruce Grove);
one specialized municipality (Strathcona County, which includes the Sherwood Park urban service area);
three municipal districts (Leduc County, Parkland County, and Sturgeon County);
ten towns (Bon Accord, Bruderheim, Calmar, Devon, Gibbons, Legal, Morinville, Redwater, Thorsby, and Stony Plain);
three villages (Spring Lake, Wabamun, and Warburg);
eight summer villages (Betula Beach, Golden Days, Itaska Beach, Kapasiwin, Lakeview, Point Alison, Seba Beach, and Sundance Beach); and
four Indian reserves for three First Nations (Alexander 134 of the Alexander First Nation, Enoch Cree Nation 135 of the Enoch Cree Nation, and Wabamun 133A and 133B of the Paul First Nation).

In the 2016 Census, it had a population of 1,321,426, making it the sixth largest CMA in Canada by population. The Edmonton CMA comprises the majority of Statistics Canada's Division No. 11 in Alberta.

Demographics

Ethnicity

Note: Totals greater than 100% due to multiple origin responses.

Language 
The question on knowledge of languages allows for multiple responses. The following figures are from the 2021 Canadian Census, and lists languages that were selected by at least 1,000 respondents.

Edmonton Metropolitan Region Board 

A fragmentation in regional cooperation and partnership has long played a divisive role within the EMR.  Particularly, Edmonton was frustrated that its surrounding municipalities were receiving an increased tax base for major industrial development, while not contributing to Edmonton's burden to maintain and build new infrastructure within Edmonton used by the residents and businesses of the surrounding municipalities.

After pulling out of the Alberta Capital Region Alliance (ACRA), Edmonton lobbied the provincial government to establish some form of regional government that would be more effective in fostering regional cooperation between it and its surrounding municipalities.  As a result, Premier Ed Stelmach announced in December 2007 that a governing board would be established for Edmonton's Capital Region. Four months later, the Capital Region Board was formed on April 15, 2008 with the passing of the Capital Region Board Regulation by Order in Council 127/2008 under the authority of the Municipal Government Act. On October 26, 2017, the Capital Region Board (CRB) was renamed to the Edmonton Metropolitan Region Board (EMRB).

Member municipalities 
The CRB was originally established with 25 participating or member municipalities – 23 of which were within the Edmonton CMA and two of which were outside the CMA (Lamont County and the Town of Lamont). The number of member municipalities was reduced to 24 on September 10, 2010 after the Village of New Sarepta dissolved to hamlet status under the jurisdiction of Leduc County on September 1, 2010. Concurrent with the CRB's name change to the EMRB in October 2017, municipal membership decreased from 24 to 13 to include only those municipalities with a population of 5,000 or more.

More specifically, the EMRB includes:
six cities (Beaumont, Edmonton, Fort Saskatchewan, Leduc, St. Albert, and Spruce Grove);
one specialized municipality (Strathcona County, which includes the Sherwood Park urban service area);
three municipal districts (Leduc County, Parkland County, and Sturgeon County); and
three towns (Devon, Morinville, and Stony Plain).

Edmonton Metropolitan Region Growth Plan 

Under the CRB Regulation, the CRB was tasked with preparing a growth plan to cover land use, intermunicipal transit, housing, and geographic information services components. In March, 2010, Growing Forward: The Capital Region Growth Plan (CRGP), consisting of individual plans for these four components and two addenda, was approved by the Government of Alberta. 

The CRGP includes a population and employment forecast for the Capital Region. With a base population of 1.12 million in 2009, the CRB has forecasted the population of the Capital Region to reach 1.31 million by 2019. However, the 2019 population estimate was reached and exceeded by 2014. The CRGP also designates priority growth areas and cluster country residential areas within the Capital Region.

List of municipalities 

The following is a list of municipalities in the Edmonton CMA, with those that are members of the EMRB indicated accordingly.

Strathcona County's 2016 federal census population of 98,044 includes 70,618 in the Sherwood Park urban service area.
The combined Wabamun 133A and 133B population of 1,622 includes 1,592 in Wabamun 133A and 30 in Wabamun 133B.

Major industrial areas 
Major industrial areas within the ECR include the northwest, southeast and Clover Bar industrial areas in Edmonton, Nisku Industrial Business Park in Leduc County, Acheson Industrial Area in Parkland County, Refinery Row in Strathcona County, and Alberta's Industrial Heartland spanning portions of Sturgeon County, Strathcona County, Lamont County and Fort Saskatchewan.

At the moment, two more major industrial areas are in the final stages of establishment. The establishment of the Horse Hills industrial area in northeast Edmonton is in the final planning stages, while Edmonton Airports is currently planning its inland port development under the Port Alberta initiative at the Edmonton International Airport within Leduc County.

See also 
 Edmonton
 Calgary-Edmonton Corridor
 Calgary Metropolitan Region

References

External links 

 
 Edmonton.com - Portal to Greater Edmonton
 EEDC - Edmonton Economic Development Corporation
 Government of Alberta Regional Dashboard economic data for the Edmonton CMA

 
Metropolitan areas of Alberta